Moshenskoy (masculine), Moshenskaya (feminine), or Moshenskoye (neuter) may refer to:
Moshenskoy District, a district of Novgorod Oblast, Russia
Moshenskoy (rural locality) (Moshenskaya, Moshenskoye), name of several rural localities in Russia